Anri Jokhadze (born November 6, 1980) is a Georgian pop singer, composer, music video director, TV presenter from Tbilisi, Georgia, who represented Georgia in the Eurovision Song Contest 2012 with the song "I'm a Joker". The singer is a winner and laureate of 13 international contests. Prior to his appearance at the Eurovision Song Contest 2012, Anri Jokhadze has also represented Georgia in the Eurovision Song Contest 2008 as a backing vocalist for Diana Gurtskaya and her song "Peace Will Come." He is also the composer of the Georgian entry at the Eurovision Song Contest 2017, "Keep the Faith" sung by Tamara Gachechiladze.

Anri has been singing since the age of four; he participated in many contests and concerts both in Georgia and abroad. He is the author of songs, and served as a screenwriter of video-clips. Anri is a producer of many newcomer singers.

He started his music career in 1998 and he has won thirteen music awards to date. He also has a title of "The Georgian Golden Voice".

Discography 
 Me Maints Moval (2005)
 I Appear on the Stage Again (2006)
 New Songs (2011)

References 

1980 births
Living people
21st-century male singers from Georgia (country)
Pop singers from Georgia (country)
Musicians from Tbilisi
Eurovision Song Contest entrants of 2012
Eurovision Song Contest entrants for Georgia (country)